Vukićević is a Serbian surname, a patronymic derived from the masculine given name Vukić, itself a diminutive of VUK (meaning "wolf"). It may refer to:

Christina Vukicevic (born 1987), Norwegian hurdler of Serbian descent
Dejan Vukićević (born 1968), former Montenegrin footballer and current manager of Mogren
Lidija Vukićević (born 1962), Serbian film and TV actress
Marko Vukićević (born 1992), Serbian alpine skier
Petar Vukićević (born 1956), Serbian hurdler
Stanimir Vukićević (born 1948), Ambassador Extraordinary and Plenipotentiary of the Republic of Serbia to the Republic of Croatia
Velimir Vukićević (1871–1930), Serbian politician
Vladimir Vukićević (born 1979), Serbian-American software developer

See also
 Vukičević
 Vukčević
 Vukić

Serbian surnames
Montenegrin surnames